Legend of the Five Rings: The Card Game is a Living Card Game (LCG) produced by Fantasy Flight Games (FFG). It is a two-player game set in the world of Rokugan. During the game, players take on the leadership of one of the Great Clans which define Rokugani society, and they are cast into conflict against another clan. The conflicts will decide the future of Rokugan. The game is an iteration of the Legend of the Five Rings collectible card game, produced by Alderac Entertainment Group in 1995. On 17th February 2021, FFG announced the completion of the game, Under Fu Leng’s Shadow being the last pack, released in June 2021.

Released Card Sets

Core Set
The Core set was shown to the public during Gen Con Indy in August 2017, and was released October 5, 2017.  In order to obtain a full playset for deck building, three copies of the Core Set must be purchased.

Box Contents

 7 Stronghold Cards
 117 Dynasty Cards
 98 Conflict Cards
 17 Province Cards
 20 Status Tokens (double-sided)
 40 Fate Tokens
 50 Honor Tokens
 5 Ring Tokens (double-sided)
 1 First Player Token
 2 Honor Dials
 1 Imperial Favor  Card (double-sided)
 5 Role Cards  (double-sided)
 2 Reference Cards (double-sided)

Premium Expansions
The first two Premium Expansions contain 234 new cards each, covering every clan and dedicated theme. The third and last one contains 271 new cards, almost half of them being dedicated to the Shadowlands faction.

Children of the Empire Premium Expansion offered plenty of support for dueling.

Clan War Premium Expansion introduced an Enlightenment format to the game, where three or more players race to claim all five elemental rings on their provinces.

Under Fu Leng's Shadow Premium Expansion introduces two new game variants: cooperative and challenge. On cooperative variant, a player can either play solo or team up with friends to take on a mighty Shadowlands warlord. On challenge variant, one of the players will lead the forces of the Shadowlands into battle against two to four other players.

Clan Packs
Each Clan Pack contains 78 cards (3 copies each of 25 new cards and 1 copy each of 3 additional new cards) designed to augment deck building options for one specific clan.

Dynasty Packs
Each Dynasty Pack typically contains 60 cards and has a complete playset of new cards (i.e. 3 copies each of 20 new cards).  Dynasty packs are generally part of a six-pack "cycle" that follows a particular storyline and theme.  A new pack is usually released monthly during the cycle.  There was an exception with the initial Imperial cycle, where they released a new pack weekly in order to quickly increase the card pool and improve deck building variety.

Imperial Cycle

Elemental Cycle

Inheritance Cycle 
This cycle introduced the Disguised keyword.

Dominion Cycle 
This cycle introduced the Eminent and Rally keywords.

Temptations Cycle 

This cycle introduced the Dire keyword.

Expansion Sets Ordered Chronologically

References

External links

Fantasy Flight Games games
Legend of the Five Rings
Card games introduced in 2017
Collectible card games